The 2009 Premier League Asia Trophy was the fourth edition of the Premier League Asia Trophy, a four-team association football tournament held every two years. Hull City, Tottenham Hotspur, West Ham United and the local Chinese Super League club Beijing Guoan competed for the title on 29 July and 31 July in the Workers Stadium, Beijing. Tottenham Hotspur won the trophy.

Competition format
The competition uses a knock-out format. On July 29, West Ham United played against Tottenham Hotspur, while Hull City meeting Beijing Guoan. Final, 3rd and 4th playoff were played two days later.

Results

Third place play-off

Final

Ticket sales issues
Ticket prices started as low as RMB80 (GBP 7) and rose to RMB380 (GBP 34). Prices were the same for both days.

However, by 15 July 2009, only 20,000 of the 120,000 tickets available for the 29 July and 31 July knockout tournament had been sold, with most fans buying the cheap seats. Reports that Beijing Guoan would field a second-string side as they rest their best players for a China Super League match against Chongqing Lifan on 2 August, while the latter refused to change the schedule also hampered sales.

References

External links
 webpage on premierleague.com
 Tottenham win Barclays Asia Trophy

2009
Asia
2009
Prem